The Grozăvești Power Station is a large thermal power plant located at 229 Splaiul Independenței Street, Sector 6, Bucharest. It has 2 generation groups of 50 MW, each having a total electricity generation capacity of 100 MW.

External links

Official site 

Natural gas-fired power stations in Romania